is a Prefectural Natural Park in Nagasaki Prefecture, Japan. The park was established in 1970.

See also
 National Parks of Japan
 Shimabara Rebellion

References

Parks and gardens in Nagasaki Prefecture
Protected areas established in 1970
1970 establishments in Japan